Donna Personna (born 1946) is a transgender rights activist and fine art artist, who focuses in photography, painting, mixed media.  Personna was friends with The Cockettes and she played a part in Elevator Girls in Bondage. 
Personna co-wrote a play about the Compton Cafeteria riot, one of the first recorded LGBT-related riots in United States history, and marking the beginning of transgender activism in San Francisco.

Biography 
Personna was born in San Jose, California, and moved to San Francisco at age 19.

Personna has served on the boards of the Trans March and Transgender Day of Remembrance.

In 2018, she raised San Francisco's first Transgender flag at San Francisco City Hall with Mayor London Breed. In 2019, she was a Grand marshal of the San Francisco Pride Parade.

Filmography 
Personna was the subject of the 2013 Iris Prize-winning short film “My Mother" and was featured in the 2014 film "Beautiful by Night." She was interviewed for the 2018 documentary, "Ruminations."

Personna's story is a major part of “The Compton’s Cafeteria Riot,” an interactive play produced by the Tenderloin Museum.

References

External links

Living people
American LGBT rights activists
Transgender rights activists
Transgender women
LGBT Hispanic and Latino American people
Artists from California
1946 births
Photographers from California
American dramatists and playwrights
LGBT people from the San Francisco Bay Area
21st-century LGBT people